Jubilee Bunt-a-thon is a 2012 animated short film directed by Nick Park, which stars his characters Wallace and Gromit. It was created in association with the National Trust to celebrate the Diamond Jubilee of Queen Elizabeth II.

The film is 1 minute 15 seconds in length and stars Ben Whitehead as Wallace.

Plot
Jubilee Bunt-a-thon follows Wallace and Gromit as they prepare for the Jubilee weekend, hoisting up bunting around Trust manor.

Production and release
Jubilee Bunt-a-thon was exclusively screened at the Jubilee parties hosted by the National Trust.

References

External links
Jubilee Bunt-a-thon at the Wallace & Gromit official YouTube channel

Animated comedy films
2010s animated short films
British animated short films
Clay animation films
Films set in country houses
Wallace and Gromit
2012 animated films
2012 films
2012 short films
2010s stop-motion animated films
2010s British films